Anna Kwitniewska (born 14 March 1979, Gdynia) is a Polish rhythmic gymnast.

Kwitniewska competed for Poland in the rhythmic gymnastics individual all-around competition at the 1996 Summer Olympics in Atlanta. There she was 27th in the qualification round and did not advance to the semifinal.

References

External links 
 
 

1979 births
Living people
Polish rhythmic gymnasts
Gymnasts at the 1996 Summer Olympics
Olympic gymnasts of Poland
Sportspeople from Gdynia